Eugene Jacobs (November 9, 1912 – May 20, 1999) was an American trainer and owner of Thoroughbred racehorses who conditioned Sheilas Reward to back-to-back American Champion Sprint Horse national honors in 1950 and 1951. He was a brother to trainer Sidney Jacobs and to U.S. Racing Hall of Fame trainer Hirsch Jacobs.

Career
Jacobs began working in 1939 at age seventeen as a groom for the stable of older brother Hirsch. In 1944 he went out on his own and over the years trained for prominent owners such as Herbert A. Allen Sr., Louis Lazare, and Perne L. Grissom.

Jacobs retired from racing on September 1, 1989.

References

1912 births
1999 deaths
American horse trainers
Neurological disease deaths in New York (state)
Deaths from Parkinson's disease
Sportspeople from New York City